Arts County Fair (ACF) was an annual large outdoor benefit concert/beer garden that ran from 1992 to 2007 at Thunderbird Stadium at the University of British Columbia, Vancouver, British Columbia, Canada.

Arts County Fair was the largest student-run event in Canada; organized, produced, and promoted by the students of the Arts Undergraduate Society of the University of British Columbia.

Event

It combined several bands of different musical genres, one hundred and fifty volunteers, and fifteen thousand patrons to create the most widely-anticipated campus event at the University of British Columbia. The fair was not held on a specific date each year, but instead on the last day of classes at UBC. This usually put the fair during the first and sometimes second week of April each year. It has been estimated that over 160,000 people have attended the event.

It usually ran from 12 noon to 8pm, and was attended by students from across British Columbia, by members of the local music and recording industries, as well as the general public. Arts County Fair was a charity event, and each year the proceeds from the concert were donated to two local or national charities.

Production
In preparation for the fair, the organizing committee used to commit one week to full scale preparation for the event. A group of 40-50 individuals, mostly composed of past and serving members of the Arts Undergraduate Society council, took to the field of Thunderbird Stadium. Preparations included setting up concession tents, placing plywood and covering over the entire field to prevent grass damage, and assisting with the set-up of fences. On the day of the fair, the volunteers then committed to a fifteen-hour work shift, fulfilling such essential jobs as safety patrols and drink distribution.

The preparations for ACF 11 were filmed in an attempt to document the event for training purposes, but the finished video was never delivered.  The partial video is available on YouTube

Food and Beverage
ACF was often heralded as the year's biggest beer garden, with alcoholic beverages being the staple at every fair. Because this caused issues with minors attending the event, ACF organizers tested out two options over the years. One is having the event completely closed off to minors, such as ACF 14. And the other to have a special beer garden section and a minors sections, such as at ACF 15. The latter option worked well with both groups of people being able to enjoy the concert. There used to also be a large section of concession stands that serve non-alcoholic beverages and various types of food.

Bands
It was the goal of the ACF organizers to represent as many genres of music at their concerts as possible. This involved frequent inclusions of rock, country and hip-hop acts in the show. Although the Fair did not exclude non-Canadian acts, ACF advertises itself as a showcase of local Canadian talent. The stage has seen many big-name bands, some before they met commercial success: The Barenaked Ladies, Crash Test Dummies, The Philosopher Kings, Matthew Good Band, Great Big Sea, Swollen Members, De La Soul, Treble Charger, K-OS,  The Weakerthans, The New Pornographers, Stabilo, Sam Roberts, and Metric.

ACF 1 - April 3, 1992 

 The Barenaked Ladies
 Spirit of the West
 Bob's Your Uncle
 The Grames Brothers

ACF 2 - April 2, 1993 

 The Crash Test Dummies
 The Bourbon Tabernacle Choir
 John James
 She Stole My Beer

ACF 3 - March 31, 1994 

 Spirit of the West
 The Spirit Merchants
 People Playing Music
 The Lowest of the Low
 Junkhouse

ACF 4 - March 31, 1995 

 Moist
 One
 The Philosopher Kings
 Rhymes With Orange
 Mollie's Revenge

ACF 5 – April 4, 1996 

 Ashley MacIsaac
 The Pursuit of Happiness
 Bass is Base
 Barstool Prophets
 The Super Friendz

ACF 6 - April 11, 1997 

 54-40
 Big Sugar
 One Step Beyond
 Mudgirl
 Pluto

ACF 7 – April 7, 1998 

 Great Big Sea
 Matthew Good Band
 Rascalz
 Holly McNarland
 Huevos Rancheros

ACF 8 – April 9, 1999 

Bands
 54-40
 Econoline Crush
 The Planet Smashers
 The Odds
 Pure

DJs
 Markem
 Eric Lewis
 James Brown
 Andy B
 Seamus

ACF 9 - April 5, 2000 

Bands
 Moist
 The Watchmen
 Danko Jones
 The Rascalz
 Gob

DJs
 Grooverobber
 DJ Kita Kaze
 DJ Sebastian
 DJ Wax
 DJ Seven vs. Cliff Vermette

ACF 10 - April 5, 2001 

Bands
 Big Sugar
 Wide Mouth Mason
 Choclair
 Limblifter
 Templar

DJs
 DJ Deko-ze
 Greg C
 DJ Deliverance
 Jay C

ACF 11 - April 5, 2002 

 The Tea Party
 Big Wreck
 Swollen Members
 Baby Blue Soundcrew (feat. Choclair)
 The New Deal

DJs
 Jon Delerious
 DJ Leanne
 Mack Hardy
 Dirty Circus (feat Sweatshop Union)
 ari + uzi

ACF 12 - April 9, 2003 

 54-40
 Treble Charger
 I Mother Earth
 The New Deal (feat Razhel of The Roots)
 Not By Choice

DJs
 Sweatshop Union
 Fourth World Occupants
 Rupix Cube
 Dana D v. Kamandi
 Needle Kineval v. Hedspin
 DJ Wundrkut

ACF 13- April 8, 2004 

 De La Soul
 Andrew W.K.
 Wide Mouth Mason
 Pilate
 High Holy Days

DJs
 Abasi vs. Glnn
 Tantra
 REV vs. Kyle Nordman
 OJ
 Crown Vic

ACF 14 - April 8, 2005 

 Matthew Good
 K-OS
 Metric
 Stabilo
 Tupelo Honey

ACF 15 - April 7, 2006 

 The New Pornographers
 The Weakerthans
 Corb Lund and the Hurtin Albertans
 Cadence Weapon
 The Salteens
 dj my!gay!husband!

ACF 16 - April 12th, 2007 

 Sam Roberts
 Aaron Pritchett
 De La Soul
 Pride Tiger
 Land of Talk
 DJ my!gay!husband!

References

Music festivals in Vancouver
Annual fairs
Fairs in British Columbia
Recurring events established in 1992
Recurring events disestablished in 2007
Beer gardens